Computer component may refer to:

 Electronic components, the constituents of electronic circuits
 Software components in component-based software engineering
 Component (UML), a modular part of a system in the Unified Modeling Language
 Computer hardware, the physical components within a computer